Naga Kala Bhairava is a 1981 Indian Kannada-language film, directed by Thiptur Raghu and produced by M. Pandurangan and M. Ramalingam. The film stars Vishnuvardhan, Jayanthi, Jayamala and Ashalatha. The film has musical score by M. Ranga Rao.

Cast

Vishnuvardhan
Jayanthi
Jayamala
Ashalatha
Dheerendra Gopal
Chandrashekar
Musuri Krishnamurthy
Somu
Vijai
Jaggu
Ravivarma
Thilak
V. Ramachandru
J. L. Manjunath
Dr. Muniyappa
Surendranath
M. S. Karatnh
Muddu Mallappa
Shashikala
Jayasheela
Halam
Lavanya
Nirmala
Lakshmi
Sarala
Merlin
Srirekha
Yashodha
Master Ravi
Baby Sangeetha
Baby Meena
Dinesh in Special Appearance
Tiger Prabhakar in Special Appearance
Shakti Prasad in Special Appearance
Saikumar in Special Appearance

Soundtrack
The music was composed by M. Ranga Rao.

References

External links
 
 

1981 films
1980s Kannada-language films
Films scored by M. Ranga Rao